Fiévet is a French surname. Notable people with the surname include:

Antoine Fiévet (born 1964/1965), French businessman
Jean-Marie Fiévet (born 1964), French politician
Valentino Fiévet (born 1991), French football player

French-language surnames